Leif Fritjof Måsvær (born 29 January 1941) is a Norwegian politician for the Christian Democratic Party.

He served as a deputy representative to the Norwegian Parliament from Rogaland during the term 1989–1993.

On the local level, Måsvær was mayor of Stavanger in two periods.

References

1941 births
Living people
Christian Democratic Party (Norway) politicians
Deputy members of the Storting
Mayors of places in Rogaland
Politicians from Stavanger
Place of birth missing (living people)